is a monthly Japanese shōnen manga magazine published by Kadokawa Shoten. It largely focuses on the Gundam franchise. There was a Chinese version published by Kadokawa Media (Taiwan) Co., Ltd, discontinued in 2008.

Overview
Gundam Ace started as a quarterly publication from 2001 to 2002, moved to a bi-monthly publication in 2003, and in 2004 it became a monthly publication. The producer is Shinichirou Inoue of Kadokawa Shoten who also produces Newtype and Shonen Ace. The chief editor is Hideaki Kobayashi.

The magazine contains a number of common features found in official fan magazines, including news on upcoming Gundam series and merchandise.

Currently serialized titles

Mobile Suit Gundam-san (Since August 2001)
Mobile Suit Gundam École du Ciel (Since December 2001)
Mobile Suit Crossbone Gundam (Since November 2002)
SEED Club 4-Koma (Since December 2004)
Gundam Unicorn: Bande Dessinée (Since March 2010) 
Gundam MSV-R: The Return of Johnny Ridden (Since June 2010)
Gundam Wing: Frozen Teardrop (Since August 2010)
Super-Class! Mobile Fighter G Gundam (Since September 2010)
Gundam Wing Endless Waltz: The Glory of Losers (Since November 2010)
Mobile Suit Zeta Gundam DEFINE (Since August 2011)
Mobile Suit Gundam SEED Re: and Destiny Ninja (Since June 2012)
Gundam MSV-R: The Fabulous Shin Matsunaga! (Since August 2012)
Char's Daily Life (Since September 2012)
People of Gundam (Since December 2012)
Mobile Suit Gundam U.C. 0094: Across the Sky (Since January 2013)
Mobile Suit Gundam: The Nameless Battlefield (Since May 2013)
Mobile Suit Gundam 0083 REBELLION (Since August 2013)
Gundam Build Fighters AMAZING (Since December 2013)
Mobile Suit Gundam Side Story: Missing Link (Since April 2014)
Gundam EXA VS (Since May 2014)
Gundam Reconguista in G (Since October 2014)
Mobile Suit Gundam: Iron-Blooded Orphans And Slayer (Since October 2015)

Featured manga

Many of the manga titles running in the magazine serve as promotion (adaptations based on recent games, animated series side stories, etc.) or parody the Gundam series/fandom.

Mobile Suit Gundam: The Origin
Mobile Suit Gundam: Char's Deleted Affair - Portrait of Young Comet
Axis' Hamaan-san 
Mobile Suit Gundam: Lost War Chronicles
Mobile Suit Gundam Gaiden : Sora, senkou no hate ni...
Gundam Legacy
Mobile Suit Gundam: Ixtab of Space
Mobile Suit Gundam École du Ciel (ongoing)
Mobile Suit Gundam SEED Astray
Mobile Suit Gundam SEED X Astray
Mobile Suit Gundam SEED Destiny Astray
Mobile Suit Gundam SEED C.E. 73 Δ Astray
After War Gundam X: Under the Moonlight
Mobile Suit Gundam SEED Destiny -The Edge-
Mobile Suit Gundam: Ore wa Renppou Guren Tai
Mobile Suit Gundam-san
Tony Takezaki's Gundam manga
Inu Gundam
Mobile Suit Buyo Gundam
Imouto Gundam
Mobile Suit Gundam Climax U.C. - Tsumuga re shi kettou
Mobile Suit Gundam ZZ Gaiden: Zion no genyou
Mobile Suit Crossbone Gundam: The Steel Seven
Mobile Suit Gundam MS IGLOO: Revelations 0079
Developers Mobile Suit Gundam Before One Year War
Mobile Suit Z Gundam: Day After Tomorrow - Kai Shinden's report
Gunota no Onna
Operation Troy
The Wings of Rean
Mobile Suit Gundam 00F
Mobile Suit Gundam 00I
New Mobile Report Gundam Wing: Frozen Teardrop (ongoing)
New Mobile Report Gundam Wing: Glory of the Defeated
 Arasa OL Haman-sama (The Thirty-ish Office Worker Haman-sama) by Masakazu Iwasaki (since January 2021) – reimagines Haman Karn as a "modern corporate section chief at an apparel company".
 Ral Meshi ~Ramba Ral no Haitoku Gohan~  (Ral Feasts ~Ramba Ral's Immoral Meal~) by Kazuya Tani (since January 2021) – "gourmet manga showing Zeon ace Ramba Ral tending to the Club Eden night club while the staff are away"
 Amuro to Boku by Osamui Wakai and Satoshi Takemiya (since December 2020)

Non-manga columns
Data Gundam 
Ages of Gundam
Okawara Factory 
Gundam Goods Navigation
Gundam Game Information 
GUNDAM"ACE"FIX 
GAME'S MSV

Giveaways
Most issues of Gundam Ace contain at least one 'free gift' item. These may be used to promote a current Gundam work or based on original manga appearing in the magazine. In the three months leading up to the premiere of Mobile Suit Gundam 00, the magazine gave away a 00 pencil board, sticker sheet and poster. A continuing series has been keychains depicting Mobile Suit Gundam characters as chickens, based on a popular manga of the same concept. Other items given away include CM collection CD-ROMs, exclusive alternate manga cover sleeves and cardboard calendar cubes.

Circulation

References

External links
Official website
Anime Newtype Channel: Gundam Ace

Bandai Namco franchises
Ace
Monthly manga magazines published in Japan
Bi-monthly manga magazines published in Japan
Quarterly manga magazines published in Japan
Magazines established in 2001
Kadokawa Shoten magazines
Kadokawa Dwango franchises
Shōnen manga magazines
2001 establishments in Japan
Magazines published in Tokyo